The South Dakota Cultural Heritage Center in Pierre, South Dakota, is the headquarters of the South Dakota State Historical Society. Opened in 1989, the center houses the State Historical Society’s administrative, historic preservation, and research and publishing offices. The Center is also the home of the State Archives and Museum which manages the South Dakota Digital Archives. Through these five programs, the South Dakota State Historical Society preserves and interprets the history and culture of South Dakota and its people.

The Museum of the South Dakota State Historical Society was founded in 1901. The collection has grown to over 30,000 artifacts. The State Archives was created by the State Legislature in 1975, but the origins of the archives collections date back to the creation of the State Historical Society in 1891. The State Archives contains over 12,000 cubic feet of records that document many aspects of South Dakota’s history and heritage.

History
The South Dakota State Historical Society was first organized as the Old Settlers Association of Dakota Territory in 1862. After joining the union in 1889, South Dakotans recognized the need to preserve the history and culture of the new state and the State Historical Society was founded on February 27, 1890. The group remained loosely organized until 1901, when the South Dakota state legislature established the Department of History. Doane Robinson was appointed Secretary of the State Historical Society and Head of the Department of History.  Its mission was to “collect, preserve, exhibit, and publish” materials on the history of the state.

In 1932, the South Dakota State Historical Society (Department of History) moved to the newly completed Soldiers’ and Sailors’ Memorial Building. This building, located directly across from the State Capitol, was erected to honor the veterans of World War I. Here, the society had its own space for offices, collections, archives, and exhibits. The Soldiers’ and Sailors’ Memorial Building served as the home of the Society until 1989. In honor of the state’s centennial, the South Dakota Cultural Heritage Center was constructed to celebrate the anniversary and showcase the state’s history.

The Cultural Heritage Center
Dignitaries, including Governor George S. Mickelson and First Lady Linda Mickelson, broke ground on this premier research center for South Dakota history on May 1, 1987. State Historical Society staff settled into the completed building in early 1989. The building was opened to the public in May 1989 and was officially dedicated by Governor Mickelson as part of the state centennial’s finale on November 3, 1989.

The 63,000-square-foot underground building serves as a reminder of the earth-berm lodges of the Arikara Indians that historically lived throughout the Missouri River Valley. The building is covered with native prairie sod from Jones County and landscaped with native grasses and plants.  Just like the sod houses and dugouts of early prairie settlers, the Center’s grasses are home to a variety of wildlife that feed on the wild flowers and herbs that grow in this natural cover.

The building’s construction provides optimum climate control, energy efficiency, and minimum potential for damage to artifacts housed in the collections of the Museum and Archives.

Museum of the South Dakota State Historical Society
The 15,0000-square-foot Museum gallery explores the economic, social, political, and cultural history of Dakota Territory and South Dakota.  The Museum’s primary exhibit, ‘’The South Dakota Experience’’, includes three galleries that illustrate the history of the state from its earliest inhabitants to present day.

Oyate Tawicoḣ’aŋ: The Ways of the People explores the history, heritage, and culture of the Oceti Ṡakowiŋ (The Seven Council Fires), known as the Sioux to some. The Oyate Tawicoḣ’aŋ gallery shares the values and beliefs of the Dakota, Nakota, and Lakota.

Proving Up shares the experiences of explorers, trappers, settlers, miners, and immigrants to a remote territory. The Proving Up gallery explores how pioneers and statesmen established a booming state.

Changing Times - South Dakota in the 20th Century examines the changes and challenges the people of South Dakota faced during the 20th century. The Changing Times gallery follows South Dakota history from the boom of the railroads and automobile to the bust of the drought and Depression. The gallery highlights the introduction of power on the plains, telephone communication, and the shrinking of space between neighbors with the construction of highways and interstates.

Changing exhibitions are featured in the Museum’s Hogen Gallery and Observation Gallery. Exhibits in the Mavis T. and Florence Brown Hogen Gallery focus on a variety of themes in South Dakota history and culture. The Observation Gallery is located upstairs from the Museum’s main gallery and features a fantastic view of the State Capitol Building and the Missouri River bluffs.

The Museum is open to the public seven days a week. For information on hours and admission visit the South Dakota Cultural Heritage Center online at South Dakota State Historical Society.

South Dakota State Archives
The South Dakota State Archives contains over 12,000 cubic feet of records that document South Dakota’s history and heritage. The South Dakota State Archives has been digitizing the state's primary sources since 2012 as the South Dakota Digital Archives, which has photos maps, manuscripts and more. For more information on the South Dakota State Archives; including online resources for genealogists, researchers, teachers, and students; visit online at South Dakota State Historical Society.

The South Dakota State Archives is open to the public for research Monday through Friday and the 1st Saturday of the month. For information on hours and fees visit the South Dakota Cultural Heritage Center online at South Dakota State Historical Society.

References

External links
 South Dakota State Historical Society

Museums in Hughes County, South Dakota
Buildings and structures in Pierre, South Dakota
History museums in South Dakota